Statistics of Bahraini Premier League for the 1988–89 season.

Overview
Bahrain Club won the championship.

References
RSSSF

Bahraini Premier League seasons
Bah
1988–89 in Bahraini football